XEMR-AM (1140 kHz) is a Mexican clear-channel station.  It is licensed to Apodaca, Nuevo León, part of the Monterrey Metropolitan area.  Organizacion Mexicana de Radio, S.A. de C.V., holds the concession.  XEMR is operated by Grupo Radio Alegría.

XEMR radiates 50,000 watts, sharing Class A status with WRVA Richmond, Virginia, on 1140 AM.  It uses a directional antenna at all times.  The transmitter is east of Monterrey, near the town of Cadereyta, Nuevo León.

History
XEMR received its first concession on December 31, 1940. It was owned by Enrique Serna Martínez and broadcast on 1400 kHz. It was sold to Propulsora del Radio in 1962, and to its current concessionaire in 1967.

External links
 FCC information on XEMR

References

Radio stations in Monterrey
Radio stations established in 1955
1955 establishments in Mexico
Clear-channel radio stations